World on a Wire is a 1973 German science fiction television serial, starring Klaus Löwitsch and directed by Rainer Werner Fassbinder. Shot in 16 mm, it was made for German television and originally aired in 1973 in ARD as a two-part miniseries. It was based on the 1964 novel Simulacron-3 by Daniel F. Galouye.  An adaptation of the Fassbinder version was presented as the play World of Wires, directed by Jay Scheib, in 2012.

Its focus is not on action, but on sophistic and philosophic aspects of the human mind, simulation, and the role of scientific research. A movie based on the same novel entitled The Thirteenth Floor starring Craig Bierko was released in 1999.

Plot
In the present day, Cybernetics and Future Science's (Institut für Kybernetik und Zukunftsforschung) new supercomputer hosts a simulation program that includes an artificial world with more than 9,000 "identity units" who live as human beings, unaware that their world is just a simulation. Professor Vollmer (Adrian Hoven), who is the technical director of the program, is apparently on the verge of an incredible secret discovery. He becomes increasingly agitated and anti-social before dying in a mysterious accident. His successor, Dr. Fred Stiller, has a discussion with Günther Lause, the security adviser of the institute when the latter suddenly disappears without a trace before he is able to pass on Vollmer's secret to Stiller. More mysterious still is the fact that none of the other IKZ employees seem to have any memory of Lause.

Meanwhile, one of the identity units in the simulation attempts suicide. This unit is deleted by Stiller's colleague Walfang to keep the simulation stable. To investigate the reasons for the suicide, Stiller enters into the simulated world to interview the contact unit. The unit, called Einstein, is the only identity unit that knows the "world" is a simulation, and this is necessary to run the program. In an attempt to become a real person, Einstein switches his mind into Walfang's body while Stiller is in contact with the simulated world. Einstein gives Stiller an explanation for the mysteries, vanishing memories, and vanishing persons, telling him that Stiller's "real world" is nothing but a simulation of the real world, which is one level above.

This knowledge causes Stiller to slip into insanity. The other "real" people interrogate Stiller and he is threatened with death, incarceration, and involuntary commitment. Stiller is finally able to convince Hahn, the IKZ psychologist, of his theory. The latter soon dies in an accident that is pinned on Stiller, marking him as the suspected murderer of both Hahn and Vollmer.

Stiller flees and searches for the necessary contact unit who can connect his "real" world with the real world, a level above. He survives several assassination attempts and discovers the contact is Eva, who was projected into the simulation after Vollmer's death (as his non-existent daughter). Stiller accepts her presence, believing they once had a romance. Eva tells him he was modeled on the real Fred Stiller, a person whom Eva loved, but who went mad with power from directing the simulation in the world above. While Stiller is programmed to die in an ambush, Eva switches the minds of the two Stillers and brings the simulated Stiller into the real world.

Music
The martial folk song "Westerwaldlied" and standard German love song "Lili Marleen" are both featured in an extended scene in which Stiller seeks temporary respite in a cabaret. During the Siskins house party scene early in the movie, Ingrid Caven sings the song "The Boys in the Back Room". "The instrumental "Albatross" by Fleetwood Mac plays during the credits of both parts, as well as a scene in Part 2.

Cast
 Klaus Löwitsch as Fred Stiller
 Mascha Rabben as Eva Vollmer
 Karl-Heinz Vosgerau as Herbert Siskins
 Adrian Hoven as Professor Henry Vollmer
 Ivan Desny as Günther Lause
 Barbara Valentin as Gloria Fromm
 Günter Lamprecht as Fritz Walfang
 Margit Carstensen as Maya Schmidt-Gentner
 Wolfgang Schenck as Franz Hahn
 Joachim Hansen as Hans Edelkern
 Gottfried John as Einstein
 Rudolf Lenz as Hartmann
 Kurt Raab as Mark Holm
 Karl Scheydt as Detective Stuhlfauth
 Ernst Küsters Bodyguard
 El Hedi ben Salem Bodyguard
 Rainer Hauer as Inspector Lehner
 Ulli Lommel as Rupp
 Heinz Meier as Von Weinlaub
 Peter Chatel as Hirse
 Ingrid Caven as Uschi
 Eddie Constantine as Man in car
 Rainer Langhans as Waiter at party

Release
A completely restored version was shown at the 60th Berlin International Film Festival in 2010. It was also released on Region 2 DVD by Kinowelt/Arthaus as part of the Arthaus premium series and by Second Sight in the UK. It has since screened at the Melbourne International Film Festival, New York's Museum of Modern Art, Rochester, NY's Dryden Theatre, the Harvard Film Archive, San Francisco's Roxie Theater, the Cleveland Cinematheque, Nashville's Belcourt Theatre, the University of Colorado at Boulder's International Film Series, and the Los Angeles County Museum of Art in 2010 and 2011, as well as at The New Beverly Cinema in 2022.

The series was released on Blu-ray and two-disc DVD by The Criterion Collection in February 2012. The Criterion release is slowed down to 24 frames per second. It was released on limited edition Blu-ray by Second Sight in February 2019, running at the original speed of 25 frames per second.

See also
 Simulacra and Simulation
 Simulacron-3
 Simulated reality
 The Thirteenth Floor
 Virtual reality

References

External links
 
 
 
 Welt am Draht page at Rainer Werner Fassbinder Foundation
 Release information by Kinowelt [in German]
 World on a Wire: The Hall of Mirrors an essay by Ed Halter at The Criterion Collection

1973 films
1973 television films
1970s dystopian films
1970s science fiction films
Das Erste original programming
Films about technological impact
Films about telepresence
Films based on science fiction novels
Films directed by Rainer Werner Fassbinder
Films shot in Cologne
German-language television shows
German science fiction films
German television films
Grimme-Preis for fiction winners
West German films
1970s German-language films
1970s German films